Werder may refer to:

People
August von Werder (1808–1888), Prussian general
Ed Werder (born 1960), U.S. sports journalist
Felix Werder (1922–2012), Australian-based composer of classical and electronic music
Rasa von Werder (born 1945), German-born stripper, bodybuilder, and church founder
Red Werder (1894-1942), American football player

Places

Germany
Werder (Havel), a town in Brandenburg
Werder, Demmin, a municipality in the district of Demmin, Mecklenburg-Vorpommern
Werder, Parchim, a municipality in the district of Parchim, Mecklenburg-Vorpommern
Werder, Märkisch Linden, a municipality in the district of Märkisch Linden, Brandenburg

Elsewhere
 Werder, former German name for borough of Virtsu, Estonia
 Werder Zone, Ethiopia
 Werder, Ethiopia
 Werder (woreda)

Other uses
 SV Werder Bremen, a German football club
 Werder pistol model 1869, a single shot pistol made in 1869